Jukka Ahti, originally Hietanen, (April 26, 1897 — February 26, 1938) was a Finnish American singer, songwriter and actor.

Ahti was born in Kotka and moved to the US as a young man. He started to perform at the workers' scenes in New York City, where he married the Finnish American actor and singer Katri Lammi. Between 1929 and 1931, Ahti made 30 recordings for Victor Talking Machine Company. Most of the recordings were made with the Italian born conductor Alfredo Cibelli and his orchestra.

Ahti's career ended because of the great depression in the beginning of the 1930s. He and his wife moved to Petrozavodsk in Soviet Karelia. They continued performing at the Finnish theatre and for the local radio station. When Stalin's terror reached Karelia in 1937, Ahti and his wife were arrested. Ahti was arrested on January 18, 1938, and was shot near Petrozavodsk on February 26.

References

1897 births
1938 deaths
People from Kotka
Finnish emigrants to the United States (1809–1917)
20th-century Finnish male singers
Great Purge victims from Finland